Sarah Finnegan (born November 14, 1996) is a retired American artistic gymnast and was an alternate for the 2012 Summer Olympics Gymnastics team.  She competed for the Louisiana State Lady Tigers at the collegiate level, and was the 2017 and 2019 NCAA champion on uneven bars.  She is the older sister of Aleah Finnegan.

Personal life 
Finnegan was born on November 14, 1996 to Don and Linabelle Finnegan.  She has three sisters, Hannah, Jennah, and Aleah, who are all also gymnasts.  Finnegan was home schooled in order to train as an elite gymnast. Finnegan began gymnastics in 1999. Her father died in August 2019.

In 2008, she and her family moved from St. Louis to Kansas City, Missouri so that she could train at GAGE.  She said, "When I was at my old gym, I went to Regionals in 2008 and I saw GAGE there and I was like, ‘Wow they’re really good - I want to be like that,’ so I talked with my parents and I’ve been there ever since."  When asked how her gymnastics has changed she said, "It has improved a lot. I’ve gotten a lot stronger and my skills have improved. They focus on a bunch of technique and the little details have really helped me a lot. I really like trying new stuff. Especially tumbling passes and on beam. Just go up there and flip and twist and see what you come up with."

Junior career

2010 
In August, Finnegan competed at the Visa Championships in Hartford, Connecticut.  She placed sixth in the all around with a two-day combined score of 111.350.  In event finals, she placed fourth on balance beam scoring 28.400 and first on floor scoring 29.200.

In September, Finnegan competed at the Pan American Championships in Guadalajara, Mexico.  She contributed a balance beam score of 14.400 towards the American team's first-place finish and placed third in the balance beam event final with a score of 14.150.

2011 
In July, Finnegan competed at the Covergirl Classic in Chicago, Illinois.  She placed fourth in the all around with a score of 56.650.  In event finals, she placed third on uneven bars scoring 14.200, seventh on balance beam scoring 14.200, and first on floor scoring 14.500.

In August, Finnegan competed at the Visa Championships in Saint Paul, Minnesota.  She placed third in the all around with a two-day combined score of 115.300.  In event finals, she placed fifth on uneven bars scoring 27.800, third on balance beam scoring 29.050, and third on floor scoring 29.100.

Senior career

Elite Career: 2012 
In March, Finnegan competed at the City of Jesolo Trophy in Jesolo, Italy.  She placed third in the all around with a score of 58.650.  Finnegan said, "It was very cool that it was Italy. It was my second time there, but my first year I didn’t get to compete because I injured my back. Competing this time was really cool because I got to see how everything works and see where I am in the competition. I learned a lot."

In May, Finnegan competed at the Secret U.S. Classic in Chicago, Illinois.  She placed third on balance beam with a score of 14.900 and second on floor with a score of 15.200.

In June, Finnegan competed at the Visa Championships in St. Louis, Missouri.  She placed sixth in the all around with a two-day combined score of 117.600.  In events, she finish second on balance beam scoring 30.400 and fourth on floor scoring 29.950.  She said, "It wasn't my best performance, but I have to learn from it and work hard and make it better for trials."  Marta Karolyi said that Sarah is a "world-class gymnast, has the international look. She still has to get a tiny bit sturdier. Yesterday or the day before, the beam routine was solid and beautiful. Today it was a little bit shaky. She needs to work on just presenting very consistently what she can do."

At the beginning of July, Finnegan competed at the Olympic Trials in San Jose, California.  She placed sixth in the all around with a two-day combined score of 118.500.  In events, she placed sixth on uneven bars scoring 29.150, fifth on balance beam scoring 29.900, and sixth on floor scoring 29.550.  She was named as one of the three replacement gymnasts for the 2012 Summer Olympics team known as the Fierce Five.

Club Career: 2013-2015 
Finnegan missed the 2013 club season due to an injury, but competed for St. Louis Gymnastics Centre in 2014.

Sarah and her sisters, who are involved in competitive gymnastics, moved back to St. Louis Gymnastics Centre in Webster Groves, Mo., a gym they used to train at until 2008. Finnegan competed in a few Level 10 invitationals during the J.O. season.

College career
Finnegan started college at Louisiana State University in the fall of 2015 and started competing with the LSU Lady Tigers gymnastics team in 2016. She was a kinesiology major.

2016 
At the 2016 SEC Championships, Finnegan helped the Lady Tigers win team silver. She finished the 2016 season ranked fourth nationally on beam and eleventh on bars.

2017 
At the 2017 NCAA Championships, she won individual gold on the uneven bars and bronze on floor, becoming the first NCAA bars champion from LSU. Finnegan also contributed to the Lady Tigers' team silver.

2018 
At the 2018 NCAA Championships, the Lady Tigers placed fourth and Finnegan individually placed seventh on balance beam and eighth in all-around.

2019
At the 2019 SEC Championships Finnegan helped LSU win the team competition.  Individually she placed first in the individual all-around, on uneven bars, on balance beam, and on floor exercise and placed third on vault.  In April it was announced that Finnegan had won the AAI Award for 2019 for being the top senior gymnast.  At the 2019 NCAA Championships Finnegan won gold on the uneven bars.  In the all-around she finished fourth behind Maggie Nichols of Oklahoma, Kyla Ross of UCLA, and Lexy Ramler of Minnesota and on balance beam she finished second behind Natalie Wojcik of Michigan.  The following day she helped LSU place second behind Oklahoma for the team title.

Career Perfect 10.0

Competitive history

References

External links
Sarah Finnegan at USA Gymnastics
Sarah Finnegan at Fédération Internationale de Gymnastique

1996 births
Living people
American female artistic gymnasts
U.S. women's national team gymnasts
LSU Tigers women's gymnasts
NCAA gymnasts who have scored a perfect 10